Lamey is a surname. Notable people with the surname include:

Kevin Lamey, Jamaican footballer
Michael Lamey, Dutch footballer
Bob Lamey, American sportscaster
Hubertus Lamey (1896-1981), German military general
Terry Lamey, Australian Rugby player
Nathan Lamey, English footballer